"Second brain" can refer to:

 The enteric nervous system.
 A now-disproven theory that some large dinosaurs may have had two brains.
 The practice of unloading to a digital storage, such as a note-taking application, that keeps relationships of concepts as a network of hierarchy.